is a Japanese writer. She has won the Shōsetsu Subaru New Writer Award, the Izumi Kyōka Prize for Literature, the Shimase Award for Love Stories, and the Naoki Prize.

Early life and education 
Chihaya was born in Hokkaido in 1979. From first grade through fifth grade Chihaya lived in Zambia, where her father, who was working for the Japan International Cooperation Agency, taught pathology at a university. Her family returned to Japan, and Chihaya started writing poetry and keeping a diary while in high school. Chihaya later graduated from Ritsumeikan University in Kyoto. After graduating from college she stayed in Kyoto and worked a variety of jobs at a cake shop, a medical office, and a museum.

Career 

Her book , a collection of short stories with common characters and the common theme of scarring, was published in 2013. Atokata won the Shimase Award for Love Stories and was nominated for the 150th Naoki Prize, but did not win. In July 2013 Chihaya married her husband. Her novel , about a woman in a sexless marriage who breaks off her affair with another man to reconnect with a male friend from her school days, was published in 2014. Otoko tomodachi was nominated for the 151st Naoki Prize, but the prize went to Hiroyuki Kurokawa.

Chihaya produced several books after her Naoki Prize nominations, including the 2016 dark fantasy novel , the 2017 novel , about a male editor and his relationships with the women around him, and the 2018 novel .

Recognition
 2008: 21st Shōsetsu Subaru New Writer Award
 2009: 37th Izumi Kyōka Prize for Literature
 2013: Shimase Award for Love Stories
 2023: 168th Naoki Prize

Works
, Shueisha, 2009, 
, Shinchosha, 2013, 
, Bungeishunjū, 2014, 
, Kadokawa, 2016, 
, Bungeishunjū, 2017, 
, Bungeishunjū, 2018, 
, Shinchosha, 2022,

References

1979 births
Living people
21st-century Japanese novelists
21st-century Japanese women writers
Japanese women novelists
People from Ebetsu, Hokkaido
Naoki Prize winners